Pooja Pal is an Indian politician from the Samajwadi Party.  She is the wife of erstwhile Allahabad West MLA Raju Pal who was gunned down in broad daylight after defeating Mohammad Ashraf in the 2004 elections for the seat.

Subsequently, Mohammad Ashraf, who was named as the prime accused in the murder became the MLA.  However, in the 2007 Uttar Pradesh state assembly elections, Ashraf was defeated by Pooja Pal.

Pooja Pal has also filed a request for a CBI investigation into the murder of Raju Pal.
Pooja Pal was elected on Samajwadi Party ticket from Chail in the 2022 Uttar Pradesh Legislative Assembly election.

References

Living people
Uttar Pradesh MLAs 2007–2012
Politicians from Allahabad
Women in Uttar Pradesh politics
Year of birth missing (living people)
Bahujan Samaj Party politicians
Uttar Pradesh MLAs 2022–2027
Samajwadi Party politicians from Uttar Pradesh
21st-century Indian women politicians